"Key to the Streets" is a song by American hip hop recording artist YFN Lucci. It was released on February 23, 2016, as the third single from his mixtape Wish Me Well 2. The track features Quavo and Takeoff from hip hop trio Migos and  Trouble. The song was produced by June James.

Critical reception
XXL magazine named "Key to the Streets" as one of 50 best hip-hop songs of 2016. Vibe magazine ranked it at number 56 on its The 60 Best Songs Of 2016 list.

Music video
On June 24, 2016, the music video for "Key to the Streets" was released on Lucci's Vevo channel.

Remixes
The official remix of the song, featuring rappers 2 Chainz, Lil Wayne and Quavo, premiered on September 14, 2016. It was released for digital download on iTunes on September 16. In November 2016, rapper Ace Hood released his own remix of the song, which appeared on his Body Bag 4 mixtape. In January 2017, rapper Fabolous and singer Trey Songz released a collaborative mixtape titled Trappy New Years, which included their remix version of "Key to the Streets".

Charts

Weekly charts

Year-end charts

Certifications

References

External links
Lyrics of this song at Genius

2016 singles
2016 songs
Migos songs
Songs written by Quavo
Songs written by Takeoff (rapper)
Songs written by June James (record producer)